The 2018–19 Atlético San Luis season is the 6th season in the football club's history. The team will compete in Ascenso MX and Copa MX. 

Atlético San Luis are the current champions of Ascenso MX after winning the Apertura 2018 tournament.

Coaching staff

Players

Squad information

Players and squad numbers last updated on 16 December 2018.Note: Flags indicate national team as has been defined under FIFA eligibility rules. Players may hold more than one non-FIFA nationality.

Competitions

Overview

Apertura

Liguilla

Quarter-finals

Semi-finals

Final

Apertura Copa MX

Group stage

Statistics

Goals

Clean sheets

References

External links

Mexican football clubs 2018–19 season
2018–19 in Mexican football